Trail of Feathers is a travel book by Tahir Shah, first published in the UK by Weidenfeld & Nicolson in 2001, and in the following year by Arcade Publishing New York. It is subtitled "In search of the birdmen of Peru" and is an account of two interlinked journeys. In the first Shah travels from Machu Picchu to Cusco, and then largely by public transport via Lake Titicaca and Nazca to Lima. From there he flies to Iquitos and sails up the headwaters of the Peruvian Amazon in search of the jungle-dwelling Shuar people to learn from their shamans the secret of human flight.

References

Preview
 Chapters 1-7 of the Kindle edition

2001 non-fiction books
British travel books
Books about Peru
Books by Tahir Shah
Weidenfeld & Nicolson books
English non-fiction books